Alleen or Lyngdal is a town which is the administrative centre of the municipality of Lyngdal in Agder county, Norway. It lies along the east side of the river Lygna, just north of the head of the Rosfjorden and northeast of the head of the Lyngdalsfjorden. On 1 January 2001, the municipal government declared the urban area of Alleen to be a town called Lyngdal. Both names are used to refer to the urban area.

Lyngdal Church lies in the northern part of the town. The European route E39 highway and County Road 43 both pass through the town. It previously had an annual cattle auction. Alleen is the site of the largest primary and secondary schools in Lyngdal.

See also
List of towns and cities in Norway

References

Lyngdal
Cities and towns in Norway
Populated places in Agder
2001 establishments in Norway